The Maybach Exelero is a one-off high-performance sports car made by Stola (now part of Blutec) in collaboration with DaimlerChrysler. It was unveiled at the Tempodrom in Berlin in 2005.

Development 

The Exelero was commissioned by Fulda, a German subsidiary of Goodyear, to test their new Carat Exelero tire range. The Exelero was the second vehicle to serve as a one-off show car for Fulda's high performance tire range, the first being the Gemballa Extremo in 1996. In collaboration with Maybach, the initial design of the Exelero was to be influenced by the Maybach SW 38 and built on the platform of the Maybach 57. Another important design stipulation from Fulda was that the car should be able to reach speeds in excess of 350 km/h (217 mph) so that the physical limits of the Exelero tires could be tested. The final design of the Exelero was produced by four students from the Transportation Design School of Pforzheim University of Applied Sciences. In 2007, Stola introduced the Phalcon, a 2-door coupe inspired by the Exelero.

Specifications

Powertrain 
The Exelero is powered by a twin turbo V12 engine made by the defunct Maybach (now a part of the Mercedes-Benz division of Daimler AG), and mounted at 60º. Each cylinder has 3 valves, and a compression ratio of 9.2:1. It is mated to a 5G-Tronic automatic transmission.

The Exelero has a top speed of 351 km/h (218 mph) and a 0-100 km/h (0-62 mph) acceleration time of 4.4 seconds.

Wheels 

The Exelero has alloy wheels with diameters of 23 inches at the front and the rear. The tires are Fulda Carat Exeleros with codes of 315/25 ZR 23 for both the front and rear. The brakes are vented discs at the front and rear, and the car comes equipped with ABS.

Interior 
The main materials used in the construction of the Exelero's interior are dark and red leather, neoprene, glossy black carbon fiber, and aluminum accents. The Exelero has sport seats with red harness-style seatbelts.

Exterior
The Exelero's exterior is black with a long hood, chrome grill and fuel cap.

In popular culture 
The car is noted for being portrayed in an episode of long-running German show Cobra 11, in which it is used in the ending chase of the episode "Freundschaft".

According to Top Gear, the vehicle was purchased by rapper Birdman in 2011 for US$8 million. Right now the car is owned by Mechatronik. In January 2012, Motorvison profiled the car, which was then owned by Mechatronik and located in Germany, and reports previous rumors of sale to be unfounded.

Jay-Z featured the car in the music video for "Lost One".

The car is also shown in the Japanese anime Nisekoi on its first season's 11th episode as a birthday gift to Chitoge Kirisaki, the daughter of the Beehive Gang boss, by Claude, the guardian of Chitoge.

The car also featured in an episode on Supercar Blondie's YouTube channel.

See also 
 Mercedes-Maybach 6

References

Further reading

External links 

Exelero
Coupés
Grand tourers
Cars introduced in 2005
Rear-wheel-drive vehicles
One-off cars